Ottawa (pronounced )  is a city in, and the county seat of, Franklin County, Kansas, United States.  It is located on both banks of the Marais des Cygnes River near the center of Franklin County.  As of the 2020 census, the population of the city was 12,625.  It is the home of Ottawa University.

History

19th century
The name derives from the Ottawa tribe of Native Americans, on whose reservation the city was laid out. In the spring of 1864, title to the land was obtained from the tribe through treaty connected to the founding of Ottawa University, the Ottawa having donated 20,000 acres of land to establish and fund a school for the education of Indians and non-Indians alike. The word Ottawa itself means “to trade”.  In 1867, the Ottawa tribe sold their remaining land in Kansas and moved to Indian Territory in Oklahoma.

On the last day of March, 1864, J.C. Richmond built the first non-Indian settlement in the new town, at the corner of Walnut and First streets.

Flooding
Ottawa has a history of flooding because of its location straddling the Marais Des Cygnes river. The area's first recorded flood was the Great Flood of 1844. In 1928, a flood crested at 38.65 feet and killed six people.

However, it is the Great Flood of 1951 which is the most famous. It was about five inches higher than the 1928 flood. The flood of 1951 affected much of Missouri and Kansas and 41 people died. One-third of Ottawa was covered because of this flood.

It is unlikely Ottawa will suffer major damage due to a flood again thanks to a series of levees and pumping stations built by the U.S. Army Corps of Engineers in the 1960s, which is part of a larger system of flood systems to regulate the Marais Des Cygnes River to the Missouri River. The levees built along the river are inspected on an annual basis to insure their quality.

20th century
In 1943, German and Italian prisoners of World War II were brought to Kansas and other Midwest states to help solve the labor shortage caused by American men serving in the war. Large internment camps were established in Kansas: Camp Concordia, Camp Funston (at Fort Riley), Camp Phillips (at Salina under Fort Riley). Fort Riley established 12 smaller branch camps, including Ottawa.

Geography
U.S. Route 50 and Interstate 35 bypass Ottawa to the south and east, while business US-50 passes through the city.

Climate
The maximum temperature reaches  an average of 52 days per year and reaches  an average of 6 days per year. The minimum temperature falls below the freezing point (32 °F) an average of 105 days per year. Typically the first fall freeze occurs between the beginning of October and early November, and the last spring freeze occurs between the end of March and late April.

There are on average 87 days of measurable precipitation per year. Measurable snowfall occurs an average of 8 days per year with at least over an inch of snow being received on five of those days. Snow depth of at least an inch occurs an average of 6 days per year.

Demographics

2010 census
As of the census of 2010, there were 12,649 people, 4,998 households, and 3,127 families living in the city. The racial makeup of the city was 91.0% White, 2.2% African American, 0.9% Native American, 0.4% Asian, 1.6% from other races, and 3.9% from two or more races. Hispanic or Latino of any race were 5.0% of the population.

There were 4,998 households, of which 34.4% had children under the age of 18 living with them, 44.6% were married couples living together, 12.8% had a female householder with no husband present, 5.1% had a male householder with no wife present, and 37.4% were non-families. 31.5% of all households were made up of individuals, and 13.5% had someone living alone who was 65 years of age or older. The average household size was 2.45 and the average family size was 3.08.

The median age in the city was 33.2 years. 27% of residents were under the age of 18; 11.5% were between the ages of 18 and 24; 25.5% were from 25 to 44; 22.9% were from 45 to 64; and 13.2% were 65 years of age or older. The gender makeup of the city was 48.5% male and 51.5% female.

2000 census
As of the U.S. Census in 2000, there were 11,921 people, 4,697 households, and 3,034 families living in the city. The racial makeup of the city was 92.77% White, 2.31% Black or African American, 1.22% Native American or Alaska Native, 0.53% Asian, 0.01% Pacific Islander, 1.31% from other races, and 1.86% from two or more races. Hispanic or Latino of any race were 4.16% of the population.

There were 4,697 households, out of which 33.2% had children under the age of 18 living with them, 49.1% were married couples living together, 10.9% had a female householder with no husband present, and 35.4% were non-families. 30.5% of all households were made up of individuals, and 14.4% had someone living alone who was 65 years of age or older. The average household size was 2.43 and the average family size was 3.00.

In the city, the population was spread out, with 26.6% under the age of 18, 11.5% from 18 to 24, 27.7% from 25 to 44, 18.3% from 45 to 64, and 15.8% who were 65 years of age or older. The median age was 34 years. For every 100 females, there were 95.1 males. For every 100 females age 18 and over, there were 89.0 males.

The median income for a household in the city was $34,071, and the median income for a family was $41,710. Males had a median income of $30,050 versus $22,891 for females. The per capita income for the city was $16,840. About 6.8% of families and 9.0% of the population were below the poverty line, including 10.0% of those under age 18 and 8.1% of those age 65 or over.

Economy
Ottawa's two major employers are Walmart and American Eagle Outfitters who both maintain distribution centers in the city.  Ottawa has freight rail service from BNSF railway.  There is also a grain elevator operated by the Ottawa Co-Op. The city operates the Ottawa Municipal Airport, a small General Aviation airport four miles south of the city.

Government

Ottawa was governed by a Mayor-Council system until 1913 when the City became a Commission form of government. In 1970 voters established the City Manager form of government with a five-member Commission that annually selects a Mayor from its ranks. The citizens of Ottawa elect commissioners at-large. Three seats on the Commission are open every odd numbered year. Two Commissioners are elected to four-year terms and one is elected to a two-year term.

Education

Colleges and Universities
The private four year university, Ottawa University, is within Ottawa, and Ottawa is also home to a branch campus of Neosho County Community College.

Primary and secondary
The community is served by Ottawa USD 290 public school district, which has five schools:
 Ottawa High School
 Ottawa Middle School
 Garfield Elementary School
 Lincoln Elementary School
 Sunflower Elementary school

Ottawa has several private schools.
 Sacred Heart Catholic Elementary School
 Pilgrim Bible Academy
 Ottawa Christian Academy

Media

Newspapers
It is owned by GateHouse Media.
A monthly publication for seniors also serves Ottawa:
 Kaw Valley Senior Monthly

Radio
Ottawa has four radio stations, one AM and three FM. KOFO broadcasts on 1220 with the tagline Your News source for East-Central Kansas. KOFO airs country music from across the decades, and specializes in local news. KCHZ 95.7 FM is licensed to Ottawa (and was, at one time, owned by KOFO); its studios are in Mission, Kansas. 88.9 is home to the Ottawa University student station, KTJO-FM. 90.5FM features the Ottawa-based KRBW's Christian programming.

Entertainment
Downtown Ottawa is home to the Plaza Grill and Cinema (formerly the Crystal Plaza and Bijou Theater) which, in 2013, was discovered to be the oldest operating cinema in America. Plans for an exhibit are in the works.

Notable people

 Steve Grogan, former New England Patriots quarterback, led Ottawa to a runner-up place in state football and to a state championship in basketball.
 Don Harrison, news anchor, one of the original anchors of CNN Headline News
 Gary Hart, former Democratic U. S. Senator from Colorado and Presidential Candidate in 1984 and 1988
 Steven Hawley, American astronaut (considers Salina as his hometown)
 Isaac Smith Kalloch, signatory of Ottawa's original town company charter, later became Mayor of San Francisco
 Semi Ojeleye, forward for the Milwaukee Bucks selected 37th overall in the 2nd round of the 2017 NBA Draft, led Ottawa to a state championship in basketball.
 Stanley Sheldon, bassist and vocalist for Peter Frampton, most notably on Frampton's Frampton Comes Alive! album.
 John G. Thompson, a prominent mathematician.
 Jerry Voorhis, U. S. Representative for California's 12th congressional district from 1937–1947

See also
 Ottawa Municipal Airport
 Great Flood of 1951
 Old Depot Museum
 Extreme Makeover: Home Edition (season 9)
 Franklin Savings Association

References

Further reading

External links

 City of Ottawa
 Ottawa - Directory of Public Officials
 Ottawa Area Chamber of Commerce
 Ottawa city map, KDOT

 
Cities in Kansas
County seats in Kansas
Cities in Franklin County, Kansas